Scott Ross is a high-profile private investigator who has worked on many notable cases such as Robert Blake, Michael Jackson,  Chris Brown, Sylvester Stallone, Danny Masterson and Bill Cosby.

In 2018 he launched a radio show, ''All Things P.I.".

References

External links 
 scottross.org

Year of birth missing (living people)
Living people
Private detectives and investigators